Caroline Kaye Walters (1957 – 12 July 2008), known as Caroline K, was an English singer, songwriter and artist/producer. She was a founding member of the UK based experimental/industrial music group Nocturnal Emissions in the 1980s. She co-founded Sterile Records with Nigel Ayers in London in 1980. She played piano on the Class War 7 inch EP single Better Dead Than Wed!

She released her solo LP Now Wait for Last Year in 1987 (the first release on the Earthly Delights label). The album's title was taken from a Philip K. Dick book of the same name. She also performed as SM Andrews. She lived in Garfagnana, Italy.

Caroline K died on 12 July 2008 in Pisa, Italy from leukemia complications.

Discography

Studio albums
 Now Wait for Last Year (LP, Album) Earthly Delights 1987 (re-released in 2010 in CD format by Klanggalerie with bonus tracks)

Production
 Tissue of Lies (LP) Sterile Records 1980
 Funky Alternatives Three (CD)
 Tracking with Close-Ups Concrete Productions, Pinpoint Records 1989
 Befehlsnotstand / Shake those Chains (CD, Album, Ltd) Klanggalerie 2007

Co-production
 Traxtra (LP, Album) Trax 1982
 Shake those Chains Rattle those Cages (LP) Sterile Records 1985
 Songs of Love and Revolution (LP) Sterile Records 1985 (re-released in CD format by Dark Vinyl Records in 1992, and by Klanggalerie in 2007)
 Project One (LP) Shankini Nadi The Produkt Korps 1987
 Beyond Logic, Beyond Belief (LP) Earthly Delights 1990
 Tissue of Lies: Revised (CD) Dark Vinyl Records 1990 (re-released by Klanggalerie in 2008)
 Befehlsnotstand (CD) Dark Vinyl Records 1992
 Must Be Musique 2 (CD) Never Give Up Dark Vinyl Records 1993
 Befehlsnotstand / Shake those Chains (CD, Album, Ltd) Klanggalerie 2007

Tracks appear on
 Funky Alternatives Three (CD)
 Tracking with Close-Ups Concrete Productions, Pinpoint Records 1989

Notes

References

 Accessed 20 January 2008
 Interview (with Nigel Ayers) in Sounds Magazine 1983
 Extended discography
 Caroline K at Discogs.com
 Caroline K at Last FM

External links

 Discography at Discogs
 MusicBrainz entries for Caroline K and Nocturnal Emissions

1957 births
2008 deaths
English experimental musicians
English women singer-songwriters
20th-century English women singers
20th-century English singers
Deaths from leukemia
Deaths from cancer in Tuscany